Sheikh Rasel Stadium is a cricket and football ground near Police Lines School and College and Islampur Jame Mosque in the city of Rangpur, Bangladesh. It is on the north side of Rangpur Cricket Garden. It has a capacity of 25,000.

See also
Stadiums in Bangladesh
 List of football stadiums in Bangladesh
List of cricket grounds in Bangladesh

References

http://www.alltravels.com/bangladesh/rajshahi/rangpur/photos/current-photo-55473037
http://www.cricketarchive.com/Archive/Grounds/4/10174.html

Cricket grounds in Bangladesh
Football venues in Bangladesh
Rangpur Riders
Sport in Rangpur, Bangladesh